This is a list of languages arranged by age of the oldest existing text recording a complete sentence in the language.  It does not include undeciphered scripts, though there are various claims without wide acceptance, which, if substantiated, would push backward the first attestation of certain languages.  It also does not include inscriptions consisting of isolated words or names from a language.
In most cases, some form of the language had already been spoken (and even written) considerably earlier than the dates of the earliest extant samples provided here.

A written record may encode a stage of a language corresponding to an earlier time, either as a result of oral tradition, or because the earliest source is a copy of an older manuscript that was lost. An oral tradition of epic poetry may typically bridge a few centuries, and in rare cases, over a millennium. An extreme case is the Vedic Sanskrit of the Rigveda: the earliest parts of this text may date to  1500 BC, while the oldest known manuscripts date to  1040 AD.
Similarly the oldest Avestan texts, the Gathas, are believed to have been composed before 1000 BC, but the oldest Avestan manuscripts date from the 13th century AD.

For languages that have developed out of a known predecessor, dates provided here follow conventional terminology. For example, Old French developed gradually out of Vulgar Latin, and the Oaths of Strasbourg (842) listed are the earliest text that is classified as "Old French".

Before 1000 BC

Writing first appeared in the Near East at the beginning of the 3rd millennium BC. A very limited number of languages are attested in the area from before the Bronze Age collapse and the rise of alphabetic writing:
 the Sumerian, Hattic and Elamite language isolates,
 Hurrian from the small Hurro-Urartian family,
 Afro-Asiatic in the form of the Egyptian and Semitic languages and
 Indo-European (Anatolian languages and Mycenaean Greek).
In East Asia towards the end of the second millennium BC, the Sino-Tibetan family was represented by Old Chinese.

There are also a number of undeciphered Bronze Age records:
 Proto-Elamite script and Linear Elamite
 the Indus script (speculated to record a "Harappan language")
 Cretan hieroglyphs and Linear A (encoding a possible "Minoan language")
 the Cypro-Minoan syllabary
Earlier symbols, such as the Jiahu symbols, Vinča symbols and the marks on the Dispilio Tablet, are believed to be proto-writing, rather than representations of language.

First millennium BC

The earliest known alphabetic inscriptions, at Serabit el-Khadim ( 1500 BC), appear to record a Northwest Semitic language, though only one or two words have been deciphered.
In the Early Iron Age, alphabetic writing spread across the Near East and southern Europe. With the emergence of the Brahmic family of scripts, languages of India are attested from after about 300 BC.

There is only fragmentary evidence for languages such as Iberian, Tartessian, Galatian and Messapian.
The North Picene language of the Novilara Stele from  600 BC has not been deciphered.
The few brief inscriptions in Thracian dating from the 6th and 5th centuries BC have not been conclusively deciphered.
The earliest examples of the Central American Isthmian script date from  500 BC, but a proposed decipherment remains controversial.

First millennium AD
From Late Antiquity, we have for the first time languages with earliest records in manuscript tradition (as opposed to epigraphy). Thus, Classical Armenian is first attested in the Armenian Bible translation.

The Vimose inscriptions (2nd and 3rd centuries) in the Elder Futhark runic alphabet appear to record Proto-Norse names. Some scholars interpret the Negau helmet inscription ( 100 BC) as a Germanic fragment.

1000–1500 AD

After 1500

By family
Attestation by major language family:
Afro-Asiatic: since about the 27th century BC
27th century BC: Egyptian
24th century BC: Semitic (Eblaite, Akkadian)
7th century AD: Cushitic (Beja)
Hurro-Urartian:  21st century BC
Indo-European: since about the 17th century BC
17th century BC: Anatolian (Hittite)
15th century BC: Greek
7th century BC: Italic (Latin)
6th century BC: Celtic (Lepontic)
 500 BC: Iranian (Old Persian)
 260 BC: Indo-Aryan (Ashokan Prakrit) 
4th century AD: Germanic (Gothic)
4th century AD: Tocharian (Tocharian B)
4th century AD: Armenian (Classical Armenian)
10th century AD: Balto-Slavic (Old Church Slavonic)
Sino-Tibetan:  1250 BC
 1250 BC: Old Chinese
8th century AD: Tibeto-Burman (Tibetan)
Dravidian:  200 BC (Tamil)
Mayan: 3rd century AD
Austronesian: 4th century AD (Cham)
South Caucasian: 5th century (Georgian)
Northeast Caucasian: 7th century (Udi)
Austroasiatic: 7th century (Khmer)
Turkic: 8th century (Old Turkic)
Japonic: 8th century
Nilo-Saharan: 8th century (Old Nubian)
Basque:  1000
Uralic: 12th century
12th century: Hungarian
 1200: Finnic
14th century: Permic (Komi)
Mongolic: 13th century (Possibly related Khitan language: 10th century)
Kra–Dai: 13th century (Thai)
Uto-Aztecan: 16th century (Classical Nahuatl)
Quechuan: 16th century
Niger–Congo (Bantu): 16th century (Kikongo)
Northwest Caucasian: 17th century (Abkhaz, Adyghe, Ubykh)
Indigenous Australian languages: 18th century
Iroquoian: 19th century (Cherokee)
Hmong-Mien: 20th century

Constructed languages

See also
History of writing
List of writing systems
Undeciphered writing systems
Origin of language
Ancient literature#Incomplete list of ancient texts
List of oldest documents

References
Notes

Works cited

 
First
Languages
Languages by time

Historical linguistics